WTPS-LP (94.1 FM) is a radio station licensed to serve the community of Napoleon, Ohio. The station is owned by St. Paul Lutheran Church. It airs a contemporary Christian music format.

The station was assigned the WTPS-LP call letters by the Federal Communications Commission on February 4, 2002.

References

External links
 Official Website
 

TPS-LP
Radio stations established in 2003
2003 establishments in Ohio
TPS-LP
Henry County, Ohio